Gustave Poncelet (1844-1903) was a Belgian clarinetist-saxophonist. He is credited with creating the first clarinet choir (this ensemble consisted of up to about twenty-seven players) at the Brussels Conservatory in the late nineteenth century while he was teaching there.

1844 births
1903 deaths
Belgian clarinetists
Belgian classical clarinetists
19th-century classical musicians